The Archdiocese of Dublin is a Roman Catholic archdiocese located in eastern Ireland, with a geographical remit comprising the city and traditional county of Dublin, most of County Wicklow and parts of counties Carlow, Kildare, Laois and Wexford.

Structure 
In 1975, the archdiocese comprised 163 parishes, but as of 2009, the number of parishes had risen to 200. One of these parishes is non-territorial, providing services to the Traveller community. The other 199 parishes had been grouped into sixteen deaneries since 2004, with pastoral responsibility for each of these deaneries resting with a number of auxiliary bishops or episcopal vicars. Each individual deanery is led by a vicar forane, whose responsibility it is to ease the administrative burden on the Archbishop.

Following the establishment of the Building Hope task force by Archbishop Dermot Farrell in April 2021, the parishes were restructured into 53 parish partnerships within fifteen deaneries, which were shared with parishes in the first week of Advent 2022.

Deaneries

Under the pastoral responsibility of Canon Liam Rigney

Blessington 
The Blessington deanery is located in the civil county of South Dublin and the traditional counties of Carlow, Kildare, Laois and Wicklow.

The vicar forane is Fr. Aidan Kieran.

South Dublin 
The South Dublin deanery is located entirely within the eponymous civil county.

The vicar forane is Fr. Philip Bradley.

Tallaght 
The Tallaght deanery is located entirely within the civil county of South Dublin.

The vicar forane is Fr. William O’Shaughnessy.

Under the pastoral responsibility of Fr. Richard Sheehy

Blanchardstown 
The Blanchardstown deanery is located entirely within the civil county of Fingal.

The vicar forane is Fr. Damian McNeice.

Fingal North 
The Fingal North deanery is located entirely within the civil county of Fingal.

The vicar forane is Canon John McNamara.

Maynooth 
The Maynooth deanery is located in the civil county of South Dublin and the traditional county of Kildare.

The vicar forane is Fr. Joe McDonald.

Under the pastoral responsibility of Fr. Paul Thornton

Fingal South East 
The Fingal South East deanery is located within the city of Dublin and the civil county of Fingal.

The vicar forane is Fr. Martin Hogan.

Fingal South West 
The Fingal South West deanery is located within the city of Dublin and the civil county of Fingal.

The vicar forane is Fr. TBC.

Howth 
The Howth deanery is located within the city of Dublin and the civil county of Fingal.

The vicar forane is Fr. Martin Noone.

Under the pastoral responsibility of Fr. Donal Roche

Bray 
The Bray deanery is located within the civil county of Dún Laoghaire-Rathdown and the traditional county of Wicklow.

The vicar forane is Fr. Aquinas Duffy.

Donnybrook 
The Donnybrook deanery is located within the city of Dublin and the civil county of Dún Laoghaire-Rathdown.

The vicar forane is Fr. Fergus O’Connor.

Wicklow 
The Wicklow deanery is located within the traditional counties of Wexford and Wicklow.

The vicar forane is Fr. Derek Doyle.

Under the pastoral responsibility of Fr. Enda Cunningham

South City Centre 
The South City Centre deanery is located entirely within the city of Dublin.

The vicar forane is Fr. Seán Ford.

North City Centre 
The North City Centre deanery is located entirely within the city of Dublin.

The vicar forane is Fr. Robert Colclough.

Cullenswood 
The Cullenswood deanery is located entirely within the city of Dublin.

The vicar forane is Fr. Paul Taylor.

Other parishes 
There is also a diocese-wide parish of the Travelling People, which was established by Archbishop Dermot Ryan in 1980 in response to the unique pastoral needs of the Traveller community in the archdiocese. The parish is under the pastoral care of Fr. Paul O'Driscoll.

Notes and references

Notes

References 

List
Catholic Church-related lists
Ireland geography-related lists
Republic of Ireland religion-related lists
Religion in Dublin (city)
Religion in County Dublin
Religion in County Wicklow
Religion in County Wexford
Religion in County Kildare
Religion in County Laois